George Lafayette Carter (1857-1936) was an American entrepreneur and known as "the empire builder of southwest Virginia."  His ventures led to the development and modernization of many parts of the southern Appalachian region during the late 19th and early 20th centuries.

Biography

George Lafayette Carter was born on January 10, 1857, in Hillsville, Virginia.  The first of nine children, he learned at a young age that farm life was not suitable for his ambitions.  As a child, he read many great works including The Bible and Benjamin Franklin's autobiography.

Carter worked at the Hillsville General Store before pursuing a career of selling iron ore properties with the Wythe Lead and Zinc Company in Austinville, Virginia.  He then found work with the Dora Furnace Company in Pulaski, Virginia, buying small mines throughout the area to provide coke for the furnaces.  Carter would found the Tom's Creek Coal and Coke Company and in 1898, combine his operations to form the Carter Coal and Iron Company before forming the Virginia Iron, Coal, and Coke Company headquartered in Bristol, Virginia, in 1899.

With the help of New York City financiers, he would also form the Clinchfield Coal Company, which owned 300,000 acres of land throughout southwest Virginia.  Carter's most reputable creations would be that of the Carolina, Clinchfield, and Ohio  Railway and the development of the town of Kingsport, Tennessee.  The creation of the railroad would further develop and open up the southern Appalachian region.

Carter would spend the years of 1907 and 1920 living in Johnson City, Tennessee, where he created a teacher's college in 1911, known today as East Tennessee State University.  Despite Carter's fame, he kept himself out of the headlines by owning the Bristol Herald, known today as the Bristol Herald-Courier.

Carter would also plan and create the coal towns of Coalwood, West Virginia, and Caretta, West Virginia.  Coalwood would later become famous as the boyhood home of the Rocket Boys and Homer Hickam.  Other operations would include the Carter Coal and Dock Company which operated in New York, Boston, Providence, and Bridgeport.  Carter maintained offices throughout the eastern part of the country, and died in Washington, D.C., in 1936.  He is buried in Hillsville, Virginia.

In 2007, the George L. Carter Railroad Museum opened on the East Tennessee State University campus.

References

1857 births
1936 deaths
People from Carroll County, Virginia
People from McDowell County, West Virginia
People from Johnson City, Tennessee
People from Sullivan County, Tennessee
East Tennessee State University
19th-century American businesspeople
20th-century American businesspeople
Businesspeople from Virginia
Businesspeople from West Virginia
Businesspeople from Tennessee